The Montgomery Water Works is located along NY 17K in the village of Montgomery, New York. The two small brick buildings were built in 1895 on land sold to the village by Arthur Patchett, whose own house still stands across the road.

It was added to the National Register of Historic Places in 2005.  a new senior housing development has been built near the water works. Workers had to take care to avoid damage to the building.

References

Buildings and structures in Orange County, New York
Water in New York (state)
Infrastructure completed in 1895
Water supply infrastructure on the National Register of Historic Places
National Register of Historic Places in Orange County, New York
1895 establishments in New York (state)